Julius Ludwig Friedrich Weizsäcker (13 February 1828 in Öhringen – 3 September 1889 in Bad Kissingen) was a German historian. He specialized in medieval history and early modern history. A member of the distinguished Weizsäcker family, his brother was the Protestant theologian Karl Heinrich Weizsäcker.

He studied theology and history at the University of Tübingen, obtaining his habilitation in 1859. He was successively a professor of history at the universities of Erlangen (from 1863), Tübingen (from 1867), Strasbourg (from 1872), Göttingen (from 1876) and Berlin (from 1881).

Published works 
 Der Kampf gegen den Chorepiskopat des fränkischen Reiches im 9. Jahrhundert, 1859 – The struggle against the Chorepiscopate of the Frankish Empire in the 9th century.
 Der Rheinische Bund von 1254, 1879 – The Rhenish League of 1254.
He was an editor of the Reichstagsakten (Reichstag files of the  Holy Roman Empire).

References 

1828 births
1889 deaths
People from Öhringen
People from the Kingdom of Württemberg
Julius
19th-century German historians
19th-century German male writers
University of Tübingen alumni
Academic staff of the University of Tübingen
Academic staff of the Humboldt University of Berlin
German male non-fiction writers